Ignacio Eizaguirre Arregui (7 November 1920 – 1 September 2013) was a Spanish footballer who played as a goalkeeper.

He played 381 La Liga games during 19 seasons, representing Real Sociedad, Valencia and Osasuna. He was a Spanish international for seven years, and appeared for the country at the 1950 World Cup.

Club career
Born in San Sebastián, Gipuzkoa, Eizaguirre signed with Real Sociedad in 1936, but no football was played in the country from that year and 1939 due to the Spanish Civil War. He made his debuts with the club in Segunda División and, after one season, reached La Liga as he moved to Valencia CF.

With the Che, Eizaguirre – who did not lineup in his first year due to suspension – won his three national championships in his first six seasons, conquering two Ricardo Zamora Trophy awards in the process. After one full decade he returned to his native Basque Country and Real Sociedad, for a further six top flight campaigns.

Eizaguirre retired at the age of nearly 40 after four seasons with CA Osasuna, still in the main category – before the last one, 1959–60, ended, he was named the club's player-coach, as the campaign ended in relegation for the Navarrese. He worked as a manager until the late 70s, with Córdoba CF, Sevilla FC and Granada CF in the top division and a host of teams in the second level.

International career
Eizaguirre won the first of his 18 caps for Spain on 11 March 1945, in a 2–2 friendly draw with Portugal in Lisbon. He was chosen by manager Guillermo Eizaguirre (no relation) for his 1950 FIFA World Cup squad, and in Brazil he featured against the United States (3–1 first group stage win) and Sweden (1–3 second group stage loss) for the eventual fourth-placed team.

Personal life and death
Eizaguirre's father, Agustín, was also a footballer and a goalkeeper. He played solely for Real Sociedad.

Ignacio died on 1 September 2013 in his hometown of San Sebastián, aged 92.

Honours
Valencia
La Liga: 1941–42, 1943–44, 1946–47
Copa del Generalísimo: 1949
Copa Eva Duarte: 1949

Individual
Ricardo Zamora Trophy: 1943–44, 1944–45

References

External links

1920 births
2013 deaths
Spanish footballers
Footballers from San Sebastián
Association football goalkeepers
La Liga players
Segunda División players
Real Sociedad footballers
Valencia CF players
CA Osasuna players
Spain international footballers
1950 FIFA World Cup players
Spanish football managers
La Liga managers
Segunda División managers
CA Osasuna managers
Real Murcia managers
RC Celta de Vigo managers
Granada CF managers
Córdoba CF managers
Sevilla FC managers
Burgos CF (1936) managers
Hércules CF managers
CD Tenerife managers
Deportivo Alavés managers